Survival Sunday is a term used to refer to final day coverage of the Premier League in England. The phrase is primarily used by Sky Sports, when relegation places are still to be decided, and is used on all the adverts for the end of season football coverage, a day when all the week's ten matches are scheduled for the same window of time.

The Fox Sports cable group in the United States also used the branding for the same coverage in 2012, when nine of that day's matches were carried across Fox's cable networks (including those that are not normally devoted to mainstream sports, let alone sports at all), except the Manchester City v. Queens Park Rangers match, which was shown on rival network ESPN2, a game that affected both the title race involving City and their city rivals Manchester United and also relegation battle involving QPR and Bolton (Manchester City won the title in stoppage time in that match; QPR survived after Bolton drew against Stoke City). Current U.S. rightsholder NBC Sports has continued the practice under the branding Championship Sunday (once again using NBCUniversal networks not typically devoted to sports, such as Syfy, and in one case, Golf Channel — a network typically devoted to golf). The phrase has since been used by other media to refer to the final matches.

Uses of the term

2004–05 season
On the final day of the 2004–05 FA Premier League, none of the three sides to be relegated had been decided. Norwich City, Southampton, Crystal Palace, and West Bromwich Albion were all separated by just two points going into the final match. It was the first time since the establishment of the Premier League in 1992 that no team was assured of relegation going into the final matchday and the closest dogfight in the top flight since 1927–28, when 11 teams were separated by only two points going into the final matchday, in an era when a win was worth two points instead of today's three. Even worse, only one team survived the drop. West Brom (who started the day bottom) needed to beat Portsmouth at The Hawthorns and they won 2–0 thanks to goals from Geoff Horsfield and Kieran Richardson meaning Baggies fans were having to nervously wait for other results. Norwich, who started in pole position, were thumped 6–0 at Fulham and were relegated after a dreadful display. Southampton meanwhile hosted Manchester United and looked like staying up after a John O'Shea own goal but the Irishman set up Darren Fletcher to equalize before Ruud van Nistelrooy headed home to send them down. In the other game, Crystal Palace traveled to local rivals Charlton Athletic and after Bryan Hughes gave them a half time lead, Dougie Freedman equalized within two minutes of coming on as a substitute before winning a penalty which top scorer Andy Johnson scored meaning the Eagles looked like staying up but Jerome Thomas's free kick was headed home by Jonathan Fortune, the game finished 2–2, relegating them. That meant West Brom became the first team to be bottom at Christmas and stay up, this resulted in the Baggies fans invading The Hawthorns pitch, Portsmouth fans joined in as their local rivals Southampton were relegated, Albion also stayed up with the lowest ever points tally in the Premier League for a surviving team with 34.

2007–08 season
On the final day of the 2007–08 Premier League season, Derby County had long-since been relegated in bottom place after experiencing the worst season in Premier League history (the Rams only won a single game all season, going an astonishing 1-8-29), but the other two relegation spots were still yet to be filled, and four teams could go down: Birmingham City, Bolton Wanderers, Fulham, and Reading. Fulham were level on points with Reading but had slightly a better goal difference. Matches kicked off at 16:00 BST. In the end, Birmingham City went down by a point to Fulham despite having a better goal difference to Fulham and despite winning 4–1 against Blackburn Rovers. Reading beat Derby County 4–0 at Pride Park but still went down on goal difference by 3 goals to Fulham who beat Portsmouth 1–0 at Fratton Park to stay up before Bolton Wanderers equalized in the 92nd minute against Chelsea to confirm their Premier League status.

2008–09 season
On the final day of the 2008–09 Premier League season, two teams from four would go down (West Brom were already relegated): Hull City, Middlesbrough, Newcastle United, and Sunderland. The matches were played at 16:00 BST. The four teams were separated by four points before kick-off. Two hours later, Middlesbrough & Newcastle United were relegated despite having a better goal difference than Hull City. All four teams lost on the final day: Hull 1–0 to Manchester United, Middlesbrough 2–1 to West Ham, Newcastle 1–0 to Aston Villa and Sunderland 3–2 to Chelsea.

2010–11 season
On the last day of the 2010–11 season, five teams — Wolves, Blackburn Rovers, Birmingham City, Blackpool and Wigan — battled to avoid the two open relegation spots (West Ham were already relegated). All five teams were separated by one point, marking the first time since 1995–96 that five teams had entered the season's final day in danger of relegation, and the first time ever that five teams facing the drop were separated by one point going into the final matchday.

After 37 matches, Blackburn and Wolves were each on 40 points, with Blackburn having the edge on goal difference (–14 to –19). The other three sides were on 39, separated only by goal difference (Birmingham City –20, Blackpool –21, Wigan –22).

Wolves hosted Blackburn at Molineux. Both sides entered the match knowing that if they won, they were assured of staying up. The other teams facing relegation played away to teams whose motivation for a peak performance was arguably limited. Birmingham were at fifth-placed Tottenham. While Spurs could secure a Europa League place with a win, manager Harry Redknapp suggested prior to the match that he would rather avoid the fixture congestion that comes with that competition. On the other hand, Spurs entered the final matchday top of the Premier League Fair Play table, which would have given them a Europa League berth regardless of their result. However, if they had entered by that method, they had to start their European campaign in the first qualifying round on 30 June, giving them an incentive to win. Blackpool were at champions Manchester United, who faced Barcelona in the Champions League final next Saturday. In the remaining match, Wigan played at mid-table Stoke City. All games except Wolves v Blackburn were shown live on Sky Sports.

The day proved almost as dramatic as the 2004–05 dogfight.

First half
At Molineux, Blackburn took a 3–0 lead into the halftime break. At the same time, two of the other key matches—Stoke–Wigan and Spurs–Birmingham—were both scoreless, and Blackpool were level 1–1 at Old Trafford.

At that moment, Wolves and Wigan were in the drop zone.

Second half
The second half of all matches saw many twists and turns, with changes in the virtual table occurring several times. First, in the 49th minute at White Hart Lane, Roman Pavlyuchenko scored to give Spurs a 1–0 lead, sending Birmingham into the drop zone. Then, in the 57th minute at Old Trafford, Gary Taylor-Fletcher gave Blackpool a stunning 2–1 lead against a United team that had dropped only two points at home all season. But five minutes later, Anderson equalised.

In the 73rd minute at Molineux, Jamie O'Hara pulled back one goal for Wolves, although at that moment they were still in the drop zone. Then, in the 74th minute, Blackpool suffered a shattering turn of fortune when Ian Evatt deflected a United cross into his own goal, putting Blackpool into the drop zone and taking Wolves out of it.

The next turn of fortune came in the 78th minute at the Britannia Stadium, where Hugo Rodallega scored for Wigan to give them a cushion of safety, and ultimately a 1–0 win. One minute later at White Hart Lane, Craig Gardner equalised for Birmingham, which took Birmingham out of the drop zone at Wolves' expense. In the meantime, Michael Owen sealed the Seasiders' fate with a goal for United in the 81st minute, giving them a 4–2 lead. Although the Old Trafford crowd sincerely applauded Blackpool post-match, it was scant consolation for their supporters.

Wolves would exit the drop zone in the 87th minute, when Stephen Hunt pulled back a second goal against Blackburn, narrowing the deficit to 2–3 (which proved to be the final score). At that moment, they would have stayed up on goals scored over Birmingham. Finally, in stoppage time, Pavlyuchenko scored his second goal to give Spurs a 2–1 victory and seal Birmingham's fate. When word came of Pavlyuchenko's second goal, both sets of fans at Molineux celebrated, first by singing songs in the stands and then storming the pitch at the final whistle.

In the end, Birmingham and Blackpool were relegated along with West Ham in the Championship next season.

2014–15 season
On the final day of the 2014–15 season, two teams: Newcastle United and Hull City, both battled to avoid the final relegation spot available (Burnley and Queens Park Rangers were relegated two weeks prior). Hull hosted Manchester United at the KC Stadium, and Newcastle hosted West Ham United at St James' Park. On goal difference, Hull led Newcastle by seven goals (–18 to –25). Hull needed to win and hope that Newcastle failed to win against West Ham to stand any chance of survival. However, it went against them, as Newcastle won 2–0, meaning that Hull were relegated along with Burnley and QPR in the Championship the following season. The Hull-Manchester United match ended 0–0.

2019–20 season 
On the final day of the 2019–20 season, fans knew only one out of Watford, Aston Villa, and Bournemouth would survive (Norwich City were already relegated). Villa and Watford were tied on 34 points, with Villa above Watford by one goal, while Bournemouth were three points and one goal behind Villa. All three teams played away from home on the last day: Villa at West Ham United, Watford at Arsenal and Bournemouth at Everton. Bournemouth had to win and hoped that both Villa and Watford lose to stand any chance of survival, while whoever had the better result among Villa and Watford would be guaranteed safety. In the end, Watford were relegated after a 3–2 loss despite a valiant comeback effort, while Bournemouth went down despite winning 3–1 due to Aston Villa’s 1–1 draw at West Ham. Jack Grealish scored what proved to be the goal that sealed Villa's survival in the 84th minute, and then they held on for the last five nerve-shredding minutes after Michail Antonio equalized for the Hammers.

NBC Sports also scaled back the number of games broadcast over the air starting with this season, instead opting to air the matches that impacted the top-four and relegation, leaving the rest of the five matches to their new streaming service, Peacock.

2021–22 season
On the final day of the 2021–22 season, Burnley and Leeds United, who were tied on 35 points, battled to avoid the final relegation spot available (Norwich City and Watford were already relegated). Burnley had the edge over Leeds on goal difference by 20 goals. Burnley needed to match Leeds’ result to ensure safety while Leeds needed to better that of Burnley. Burnley hosted Newcastle United while Leeds travelled to Brentford. 

The end result, however, was Jack Harrison's last minute comeback against Brentford. Raphinha opened the scoring with a second-half penalty, before Sergi Canós equalized with ten minutes to go, only for Canós to then get two yellow cards in as many minutes (the first for over-celebration of his goal, the second for a foul on Raphinha) which, along with their having no substitutes left after Kristoffer Ajer went off injured, reduced the Bees to nine men. The game ultimately ended in a 2–1 victory to Jesse Marsch's side after Harrison's late winner, though even a draw would have kept them up in the end. On the other hand, Newcastle, who spent most of the first half in a relegation dogfight, took the lead against Burnley after only 18 minutes when Nathan Collins committed a handball while defending from a corner kick; Callum Wilson scored from the resulting penalty, before getting another goal early in the second half. A consolation goal from Maxwel Cornet wasn't enough, so that meant after six consecutive seasons in the Premier League, the Clarets went down to the Championship. Consequently, Leeds United became the first side since Wigan Athletic in 2011 to survive after starting the final day in the bottom three.

US media coverage
In the United States, NBC Sports carries exclusive coverage of the Premier League. All season long, matches air on NBC, CNBC and USA Network. However on Championship Sunday matches often air on networks that do not generally air Premier League soccer, these networks include:

Golf Channel (2019–present)
SYFY (2014–2019, 2022–present)
MSNBC (2014–2019)
Olympic Channel (2017–2019)
NBC Sports Regional Networks (2018–2019)
Bravo (2014–2018)
E! (2014–2018)
Oxygen (2014–2018)
Esquire Network (2014–2016)

References

Sky Sports
Premier League on television